Borja Toranzo (10 October 1759 – 30 October 1847) was an Argentine philanthropist and patriot. She was one of the most important collaborators of José de San Martín, General of the Army of the Andes. She is considered one of the most important women in the history of San Juan Province.

Biography
During the preparation of the Army of the Andes, a public fundraiser was held to buy equipment and arms for the troops. In June 1815, donated to this cause some of her gems and a monetary sum of 111 pesos 5 reales.

Toranzo married young to army Lieutenant Estanislao de Zavalla y Zavala, who had children from his first marriage. When she was widowed, Toranzo had to care for the stepchildren and three children of her own, Pedro José, Matías, and Juana Agustina Zavalla Toranzo. Pedro José was a deputy of the first provincial legislature and Matías would become a successful business who built a fortune in Buenos Aires via industrialization and the exportation of oils and fats.

Citations

1759 births
1847 deaths
Argentine philanthropists
People from San Juan, Argentina